Liu Sui (died 154 BC) was the son of Liu You. When Emperor Wen of Han ascended to the throne in 180 BC, Sui was made the Prince of Zhao in place of Lü Lu while other relatives were given other principalities to rule at the end of Lü Clan Disturbance.

During the reign of Emperor Jing of Han, key advisor Chao Cuo suggested that the emperor use past ignored offences committed by the princes to reduce size of their lands, and Sui lost the Changshan Commandery in this process. Out of anger at this decision by the emperor, Sui was persuaded to join the Rebellion of the Seven States. He allied with the Xiongnu forces and battled general Li Ji's forces. The Zhao forces were eventually wiped out by general Luan Bu followed by his conquest in the Qi state regions, and Sui committed suicide.

References

154 BC deaths
Han dynasty imperial princes
Year of birth unknown